The Aeros Accent is a Ukrainian single-place, paraglider that was designed and produced by Aeros of Kyiv.

Design and development
The Accent was intended as a beginner paraglider and was AFNOR certified as "standard" in 1999. The aircraft was in production in 2003, but is no longer available. The variant number indicates the wing area in square metres.

Variants
Accent 26
Accent 28
AFNOR certified.
Accent 30
AFNOR certified.

Specifications (Accent 26)

References

Paragliders
Accent